Thomas Otten is a French countertenor singer in the Classical Crossover style.

Otten was classically trained as a child, learning piano and singing in chamber choirs. His voice did not break as thoroughly as usual upon reaching adolescence, retaining a high contralto range. Abandoning a career as a biologist, Otten studied for a diploma in lyrical song at the Conservatoire National de Région (CNR) in Lille followed by further studies in early music at the CNR in Paris. Signed to EMI subsidiary, Virgin Music, and released his first album, Close to Silence, in 1999, which was composed by Frédéric Momont. A second album, Portraits, followed in 2003 also released by Virgin Music (both albums were released in USA on Higher Octave label). A compilation disc was released by Strathan Media Productions in 2007, followed by a duo album with Stéphanie Arcadias released by Strathan Music in 2011. The latest album, Transcend to Void, with Kyle Kamal Helou on Shakuhachi, released on Magnatune.com (August 2014).

Discography
 1999 - Close to Silence (Virgin Music)
 2003 - Portraits (Virgin Music)
 2007 - Open Wings (Strathan Media Productions) (compilation of tracks on Close to Silence and Portraits)
 2011 - Two Voices with Stéphanie Arcadias (Strathan Music)
 2014 - Transcend to Void with Kyle Kamal Helou (Magnatune.com)

References

New-age musicians
Year of birth missing (living people)
Living people
French countertenors
French male singers
Operatic countertenors